Prayer of a Common Man is the fourth studio album by American country music artist Phil Vassar. It was released on April 22, 2008 on Universal South Records. The album has produced two singles for Vassar on the Billboard Hot Country Songs charts: "This Is My Life" (#35) and "Love Is a Beautiful Thing" (#2). The latter song was originally a Top 40 country hit for Canadian country singer Paul Brandt, whose version of the song was entitled "It's a Beautiful Thing". "I Would" was released in July 2008 as the third single and peaked at #26 in the fall of 2008. The title song from the album was released as the fourth single in March 2009, but only peaked at #53, thus becoming his first single to miss the top 40 since 2003's "Ultimate Love", which was a #41 hit.

The album debuted at number ten on the U.S. Billboard 200 chart, selling about 27,000 copies in its first week.

Track listing

Chart performance

References

2008 albums
Phil Vassar albums
Show Dog-Universal Music albums
Albums produced by Mark Wright (record producer)